Edgar Gorgas (23 April 1928 – 15 May 2019) was a German boxer. He competed in the men's heavyweight event at the 1952 Summer Olympics.

References

1928 births
2019 deaths
German male boxers
Olympic boxers of Germany
Boxers at the 1952 Summer Olympics
Sportspeople from Essen
Heavyweight boxers